Brian Patrick Stelter (born September 3, 1985) is an American journalist best known as the former chief media correspondent for CNN and host of the CNN program Reliable Sources, roles he held from 2013 to 2022. Stelter is also a former media reporter for The New York Times and editor of TVNewser.

Early life and education
Stelter was born on September 3, 1985, in Damascus, Maryland, the son of Donna and Mark Stelter. He attended Damascus High School, graduating in 2003, followed by Towson University where he served as editor-in-chief of The Towerlight from 2005 to 2007. While still a student, he created TVNewser, a blog about television and cable news which he later sold to Mediabistro and became a part of the Adweek blog network.

Career
After graduating from college in May 2007, Stelter joined The New York Times as a media reporter at 22, making him one of the youngest staff members at the time.

In November 2013, he became the new host of CNN's Reliable Sources and also a senior media correspondent for CNN Worldwide. On August 18, 2022, CNN canceled Reliable Sources. Stelter departed the network after its final episode on August 21. The cancellation was one of a number cost-cutting moves at CNN, and its parent, Warner Bros. Discovery. Stelter criticized the network's decision to cancel the show, stating "It's not partisan to stand up for decency and democracy and dialogue."

In September 2022, Stelter joined the Walter Shorenstein Media and Democracy Fellowship at Harvard Kennedy School.

On January 17, 2023, Stelter hosted a panel on "The Clear and Present Danger of Disinformation" at the World Economic Forum annual meeting in Davos.

Personal life
Stelter was raised Methodist, and is now nonreligious. Stelter dated CNBC anchor Nicole Lapin in 2011. He stated he had to inform his editor of the relationship, and he agreed not to cover CNBC while they were dating.

On February 22, 2014, he married Jamie Shupak, a traffic anchor for NY1. The couple married in a Jewish ceremony, and are raising their children in Shupak's Jewish faith. They have two children. They live in Manhattan, New York City.

Bibliography
 Top of the Morning (2013)
  Hoax: Donald Trump, Fox News and the Dangerous Distortion of Truth (2020)

References

External links

 Personal Website
 
 Brian Stelter - The New York Times
 Towson University's page about Stelter
 Johnson, Peter. "Student energizes the news blog biz, "USA Today", July 10, 2006.
 Bosman, Julie. "The Kid With All the News About the TV News, The New York Times, November 20, 2006, retrieved November 22, 2006.
 Friedman, Jon. "TVNewser's Stelter is Online Journalist of the Year," "Marketwatch," December 15, 2006
 Malone, Noreen. "What Happens When You Give TV's Biggest Fanboy His Own TV Show? The remarkable rise of Brian Stelter, The New Republic, January 22, 2014; retrieved February 13, 2014.

1985 births
Living people
People from Damascus, Maryland
Journalists from Maryland
Writers from Maryland
American male journalists
American television news anchors
American bloggers
American newspaper editors
American media critics
Former Methodists
The New York Times people
CNN people
Towson University alumni
21st-century American journalists
21st-century American non-fiction writers